Stavros Tziortziopoulos (born 15 August 1978) is a Greek former professional footballer who played as a defender. He is the current manager of AEK Athens U12 team.

Career
Born in Athens, Tziortziopoulos started his career at third division side Keratsini in the 1997/98 season and his performances caught the eye of Olympiacos, who signed him in the summer of 1998. Six months later he went on loan to Iraklis to gain experience and stayed until January 2000, when he returned to Olympiacos to make his debut. The defender, a former Greek Under-21 international, played ten times as they won the 1999/00 league title but only featured four more times in the following two triumphs. In July 2002, he joined Akratitos  and the next summer he was on the move again, signing for Panionios. It was there that his career took off and after a fine season he joined AEK Athens in the summer of 2004–05. When signing in AEK, Tziortziopoulos was considered one of the best left-footed backs in Greece. After a faw games with the team it was thought that he would join the national team of Greece. Unfortunately, he was injured in December 2004 and returned more than a year later. Since then, he has had his ups and downs, unable to stabilise his appearances with the team.

On 12 November 2006, he scored for the first time for AEK Athens against AEL. On 7 June 2007, Tziortziopoulos was released by AEK Athens and immediately signed with the Cypriot side Omonia Nicosia.

References
Guardian Football
Profile at Onsports.gr

1978 births
Living people
Association football defenders
Olympiacos F.C. players
Iraklis Thessaloniki F.C. players
A.P.O. Akratitos Ano Liosia players
Panionios F.C. players
AEK Athens F.C. players
AC Omonia players
Xanthi F.C. players
Panthrakikos F.C. players
AEL Kalloni F.C. players
Thrasyvoulos F.C. players
Super League Greece players
Cypriot First Division players
Greek expatriate footballers
Expatriate footballers in Cyprus
Greek expatriate sportspeople in Cyprus
AEK F.C. non-playing staff
Footballers from Athens
Greek footballers